Wang Lutong (born 1 September 1969) is a Chinese diplomat.

Biography
In 1992 he entered the Ministry of Foreign Affairs of the People's Republic of China.
From 1992 to 1996 he was attached the Information Department.
From 1996 to 2000 he was third secretary in the Chinese Embassy in London.
From 2000 to 2002 he was third secretary, Deputy Director of the Information Department.
From 2002 to 2003 he was second secretary, Director of the Department of West Europe Affairs.
From 2003 to 2005 he was first secretary, counsellor in the General Office.
From 2005 to 2007 he was counsellor and Director of the Office of Foreign Affairs Leading Group of the Central Committee of the Communist Party of China.
From 2007 to 2011 he was Associate Counsel to the Office of Foreign Affairs Leading Group, CPC Central Committee
From 2011 to 2013 he was Counsel of the Office of Foreign Affairs Leading Group, CPC Central Committee
From 2013 to 2017 he was designated Chinese ambassador to New Zealand where he is since  accredited.
From 2017 to 2019 he was deputy director of the Foreign Ministry Protocol Department.
In 2019 he was appointed director of the Foreign Ministry European Affairs Department.
He is also accredited in Avarua (Cook Islands) and Alofi, Niue (Niue).
He is married and has one son.

References

1969 births
Living people
Ambassadors of China to New Zealand
Ambassadors of China to Niue